Sarrabulho is a traditional pork blood-based dish of the Minho Province, in the Norte region of Portugal, with deep roots in all of the country, which has given it a prominent place on the menu of regional and national gastronomy. There are dishes of sarrabulho by itself as well as of sarrabulho rice and sarrabulho porridge. Sarrabulho is a traditional dish of the Portuguese cuisine that is associated with the traditional, ancient slaughter of the pig, a moment of family and neighborhood reunion throughout the times and across the Portuguese countryside that involved different tasks - the slaughter of the pig, the utilization of the blood, the burning of the hair and cleaning of the pig, the cutting of the pig, the division of the meats and the preparation of the first dishes with the prepared meats, among them the sarrabulho. Ponte de Lima's sarrabulho rice is particularly famed and praised.

References

Portuguese cuisine
Pork dishes
Offal